The Consensus 2008 College Basketball All-American team, as determined by aggregating the results of four major All-American teams.  To earn "consensus" status, a player must win honors from a majority of the following teams: the Associated Press, the USBWA, The Sporting News and the National Association of Basketball Coaches.

2008 Consensus All-America team
The following players were consensus All-Americans.

Individual All-America teams

AP Honorable Mention:

 Joe Alexander, West Virginia
 Josh Alexander, Stephen F. Austin
 Ryan Anderson, California
 Darrell Arthur, Kansas
 Jerryd Bayless, Arizona
 Marqus Blakely, Vermont
 Jon Brockman, Washington
 Chase Budinger, Arizona
 Jaycee Carroll, Utah State
 Mario Chalmers, Kansas
 Lee Cummard, BYU
 Scott Cutley, Cal State Fullerton
 Louis Dale, Cornell
 Jeremiah Dominguez, Portland State
 Wayne Ellington, North Carolina
 Adam Emmenecker, Drake
 Al Fisher, Kent State
 Gary Forbes, Massachusetts
 J. R. Giddens, New Mexico
 Jamont Gordon, Mississippi State
 Mike Green, Butler
 James Harden, Arizona State
 Alex Harris, UC Santa Barbara
 Andrew Hayles, Alabama State
 Richard Hendrix, Alabama
 George Hill, IUPUI
 Lester Hudson, Tennessee-Martin
 Ty Lawson, North Carolina
 Courtney Lee, Western Kentucky
 Tony Lee, Robert Morris
 Eric Maynor, VCU
 O. J. Mayo, USC
 Drew Neitzel, Michigan State
 DeMarcus Nelson, Duke
 David Padgett, Louisville
 Jeremy Pargo, Gonzaga
 A. J. Price, Connecticut
 Arizona Reid, High Point
 Tyrese Rice, Boston College
 Brandon Rush, Kansas
 Thomas Sanders, Gardner-Webb
 Sean Singletary, Virginia
 Jamar Smith, Morgan State
 Tyler Smith, Tennessee
 Greg Sprink, Navy
 Jason Thompson, Rider
 Sam Young, Pittsburgh

Academic All-Americans
On February 26, 2008, CoSIDA and ESPN The Magazine announced the 2009 Academic All-American team with Adam Emmenecker headlining the University Division as the men's college basketball Academic All-American of the Year.

2007–08 ESPN The Magazine Academic All-America Men’s Basketball Team (University Division) as selected by CoSIDA:

References

NCAA Men's Basketball All-Americans
All-Americans